The Cape Panwa Hotel is a luxury hotel on the island of Phuket, Thailand. It was considered one of the first luxury resorts in Phuket upon its completion in 1980.

The hotel is known for its idiosyncratic charm: odd features include the hotel's pet otter, the vintage hotel tram, a sunken labyrinthine bridge that projects out into the corral reef, and frequent visitations by bathing monkeys. The hotel has provided the site for numerous documentaries as well as major film shoots. The owner and current founder is environmentalist and TSPCA president Tirapongse Pangsrivongse.

The Cape Panwa Hotel is a member of the Cape and Kantary Hotel group, one of Thailand's hotel and serviced apartment chains.

Events 
Cape Panwa Hotel is the Title sponsor of an international sailing regatta that is held each July and based at Cape Panwa Hotel and its sister resort Kantary Bay Hotel.

References

Sources 
https://web.archive.org/web/20090201214351/http://capepanwa.com/index.asp
www.hotelsoftherichandfamous.com/hotels/the-cape-panwa-hotel-and-spa/the-cape-panwa-hotel-and-spa.cfm 
www.hotelthailand.com/phuket/capepanwa/

Hotels in Thailand
Hotels established in 1980
Hotel buildings completed in 1980
Buildings and structures in Phuket province